Levi Hubbell (April 15, 1808 – December 8, 1876) was an American lawyer, judge, and politician.  He was the first Wisconsin state official to be impeached by the Wisconsin State Assembly in his role as Wisconsin circuit court judge for the 2nd circuit.  He was also Chief Justice of the Wisconsin Supreme Court prior to the 1852 law which organized a separate Supreme Court, and he later became the first United States Attorney for the Eastern District of Wisconsin.  He served one term each in the Wisconsin State Assembly and New York State Assembly.

Biography

Born in Ballston, New York, Hubbell graduated from Union College in 1827 and was admitted to the New York Bar. He practiced law with his brother at Canandaigua, New York.

Hubbell was appointed adjutant general of the New York Militia from 1833 to 1836 by Governor William Marcy and served in the New York Assembly in 1841 as a Whig.

In 1844, Hubbell moved to Milwaukee, Wisconsin Territory where he practiced law at Finch & Lynde. When Wisconsin was admitted to the union on May 29, 1848, he ran as an independent Democrat in the second district, which then included both Milwaukee and Dane counties and was elected as one of the Wisconsin Circuit Court judges, which at that time constituted the Wisconsin Supreme Court. Hubbell became chief justice of the supreme court after Alexander W. Stow left office. In 1853, however, when a new separate Supreme Court was being organized, Hubbell lost the nomination for a seat on the new court.

Hubbell remained a circuit court judge, but was impeached and acquitted  by the Wisconsin State Legislature on charges of corruption. He soon resigned in 1856, but in 1863, he was elected to the Wisconsin State Assembly.

In 1871, he was appointed United States Attorney for the Eastern District of Wisconsin, but was forced to resign in 1875 because of accusations of corruption.

Hubbell died in Milwaukee on December 8, 1876.  He was buried at Forest Home Cemetery in Milwaukee.

He was married twice. He had two sons with his first wife, Miss DeWitt of Albany, and a son, Dr. Singleton Beall Hubbell, M.D., and a daughter with the second wife, Miss Beall.

See also
Impeachment in the United States

References

People from Ballston, New York
Union College (New York) alumni
Military personnel from New York (state)
New York (state) lawyers
New York (state) Whigs
Members of the New York State Assembly
Members of the Wisconsin State Assembly
Chief Justices of the Wisconsin Supreme Court
Wisconsin state court judges
United States judges impeached by state or territorial governments
1808 births
1876 deaths
United States Attorneys for the Eastern District of Wisconsin
19th-century American judges
19th-century American lawyers